Infinite H was the first official sub-unit of South Korean boy band Infinite formed under Woollim Entertainment in 2013. The sub-group consisted of Infinite member Dongwoo and ex-Infinite member Hoya. The sub-unit debuted with their mini album titled Fly High in January 2013.

History

2012: Pre-debut
Prior to their debut as a subgroup, the duo had performed new songs such as "Crying" and "You Look Good" during Infinite's concerts and had already received much attention. Although they had been releasing new songs during concerts, Woollim Entertainment only announced that they will be promoting as a sub-unit in 2013 after finishing up with Infinite's activities in Japan. They also performed, "Without You", a song from their debut album at the “Infinite Concert That Summer” on August 8, 2012. On December 20, 2012, they performed for the first time as a duo on M! Countdown for a special stage.

2013–14: Debut with Fly High
On January 11, 2013, their debut EP Fly High was officially released. The duo started promotions for the album on January 10, 2013, on M! Countdown.

On February 28 and March 1, 2014, during Infinite's encore concert, "One Great Step Returns", Infinite H performed their new song Alone, which written by them. The song was later added to Infinite's second full album, Season 2.

2015-2017: Fly Again and Hoya's Departure
On January 26, 2015, their made comeback after two-years with released their second EP, Fly Again. They also held a press conference and a showcase on the same day at AX Korea, in Seoul. Promotions for the album started on January 31, on M! Countdown.

In August 2017, Hoya left Infinite and Infinite H. The future of Infinite H remains in doubt.

Members
Jang Dong-woo (장동우) – main rap
Hoya (Lee Howon; 이호원) – rap, vocals

Discography

Albums

Mini-albums

Singles

Other charted songs

Filmography

Television series

Awards and nominations

References

Musical groups established in 2013
Musical groups from Seoul
K-pop music groups
South Korean boy bands
South Korean dance music groups
South Korean hip hop groups
Infinite (group)
Woollim Entertainment artists
Hip hop duos
2013 establishments in South Korea